New Frontier (also known as Frontier Horizon) is a 1939 American Western film starring John Wayne, Ray "Crash" Corrigan, Raymond Hatton, and Jennifer Jones. This was the last of eight Three Mesquiteers Western B-movies with Wayne (there were 51 altogether). A restored 35 mm copy of the film exists, and was screened at the Museum of Modern Art in New York City as part of a 2007 John Wayne centennial retrospective, which included The Big Trail, The Searchers, and True Grit.  The leading lady is Jennifer Jones, billed as Phylis Isley, in her film debut. The director was George Sherman.

Plot
When politician William Proctor announces that a dam will be built on a site where many settlers have built homes, a retired major who founded the settlement leads a backlash. Eventually, the fight comes to the attention of the Three Mesquiteers—Stoney Brooke, Tucson Smith and Rusty Joslin—who try to find a peaceful solution. However, they soon realize Proctor will resort to any trickery to get his way.

Cast

 John Wayne as Stony Brooke
 Ray Corrigan as Tucson Smith
 Raymond Hatton as Rusty Joslin
 Jennifer Jones as Celia Braddock (billed as Phylis Isley)
 Eddy Waller as Major Steven Braddock
 Sammy McKim as Stevie Braddock
 LeRoy Mason as M.C. Gilbert
 Harrison Greene as William Proctor
 Wilbur Mack as Mr. Dodge
 Reginald Barlow as Judge Bill Lawson
 Burr Caruth as Dr. William "Doc" Hall
 Dave O'Brien as Jason Braddock
 Hal Price as Sheriff
 Jack Ingram as Henchman Harmon
 Bud Osborne as Dickson

See also
 John Wayne filmography

References

External links

 
 
 
 
 

1939 films
1939 Western (genre) films
American Western (genre) films
American black-and-white films
1930s English-language films
Three Mesquiteers films
Films directed by George Sherman
Republic Pictures films
1930s American films